Anne Seibel is an art director. On January 24, 2012, she was nominated for an Academy Award for the film Midnight in Paris in the category of Best Art Direction. She shared her nomination with Hélène Dubreuil.

References

External links

Art directors
Living people
Year of birth missing (living people)